Alexis Enam Mendomo  (born November 25, 1986) is a Cameroonian football midfielder.

Career highlights
In Tunisia with Club Africain 
Tunisian Champion 2008 Winner
North African Cup 2008 Winner
North African Cup 2010 Winner
Tunisian League 2009 Vice-Champion
Tunisian League 2010 Vice-Champion
CAF Cup 2011 Finalist

In Libya with Ittihad Tripolis 

Libyan Championschip 2007 
Libyan Championschip 2006
Libyan Super Cup in 2006

External links
Camfoot.com

1986 births
Living people
Association football midfielders
Cameroonian footballers
Cameroonian expatriate footballers
Expatriate footballers in Libya
Expatriate footballers in Egypt
Expatriate footballers in Saudi Arabia
Cameroon international footballers
Footballers at the 2008 Summer Olympics
Cameroonian expatriate sportspeople in Libya
Olympic footballers of Cameroon
Cameroonian expatriate sportspeople in Tunisia
Les Astres players
Al-Ittihad Club (Tripoli) players
CS Sfaxien players
Al-Raed FC players
Ittihad Tanger players
Saudi Professional League players
Libyan Premier League players